Xtreme Fighting Championships (XFC) is a premier international mixed martial arts (MMA) organization based in Spring Lake, Michigan, with offices throughout the United States and South America. The XFC showcases both male and female fighters, advocates young MMA fighters, and produces stadium fight cards in various locations in the United States and South America, including Florida, Kentucky, Tennessee, Michigan, Brazil, São Paulo, Campinas, and Araraquara. 

Throughout 2006–2012, the XFC hosted 4–6 events per year, travelling around the United States and Greece. In 2013, the company announced its new executive team, as well as a broadcast partnership with an open broadcaster in South America, Rede TV!. This began the International Tournament & Super-Fight Series. The unprecedented success of the 2014 Season I Series allowed the XFC to secure various partnerships with various global broadcasters, including Terra TV, HBO America, and UOL. The XFC featured more than 185 MMA fighters from 36 countries.

After a 4-year hiatus, XFC has returned in late 2020, with a relaunch event, XFC 43, that took place on November 11, 2020, in Atlanta, Georgia. Milpitas ca, Alfonso Montano

History

XFC 1: Dynamite
The organization's first stadium event was called XFC 1: Dynamite and was staged at the St. Pete Times Forum in Tampa, Florida on November 11, 2007.  The show officially drew over 11,000 MMA fans, tripling the former record for attendance at an MMA event in the state of Florida.

XFC 2: Rage in the Cage
The XFC returned to the St. Pete Times forum on March 2, 2008, with a show called XFC 2: Rage in the Cage.  Among the celebrities in attendance was former professional wrestling star Hulk Hogan, who watched his nephew David Bollea win his professional debut on the XFC undercard.  Bollea had issued a to boxer-versus-MMA fighter challenge to boxing champion Floyd Mayweather leading up to his fight.

XFC 3: Battle in the Bluegrass
The company's third event was its first show staged outside of Florida, taking place at the Rupp Arena in Lexington, Kentucky and drew 6,000 fans on Saturday, June 7; a small riot broke out after the main event, when local favorite Benny Stanley was choked out by Scott Porter in 13 seconds, leading to one arrest. Another known local Brad Chamberlain won via KO in the first round.  WNKY, Lexington's NBC News affiliate, reported that XFC set the Kentucky statewide record for MMA attendance with the promotion.

XFC 4: Judgement in the Cage
 XFC 4: Judgement in the Cage 
returned to the St. Pete Times Forum in Tampa on June 28, 2008 and drew over 10,700 fans, at the time the second largest crowd for an MMA promotion in Florida history.—trailing only XFC's first Dynamite for the overall Florida attendance record.  John "Mulatto Mauler" Mahlow defeated Eben "The Big O" Oroz by unanimous decision for the XFC lightweight title in the main event, and in the undercard, the much-heralded Matt Juncal—a three-time high school state wrestling champion from nearby Brandon, Florida and a former college All-American wrestler—made his MMA debut, defeating the also-debuting Jeff Mansir by submission in the first round.

XFC 5: Return of the Giant
The main event of XFC's fifth show, XFC 5: Return of the Giant, which took place on September 13, 2008 at the St. Pete Times Forum, featured the MMA comeback of Gan McGee.  McGee, who stands six-foot, 10-inches tall and is known as "The Giant," had last fought on American soil during a UFC Pay-Per-View, when he battled heavyweight champion Tim Sylvia for UFC's world title. The fight ended up being highly controversial; Sylvia defeated McGee, but tested positive for steroids in a post-fight drug test. Sylvia was suspended by the Nevada Boxing Commission for six-months and was stripped of his title, but McGee was never granted a rematch, nor was the loss expunged from his record.  McGee faced Johnathan Ivey, a 250-pound brawler who stated that McGee "should've stayed retired."

Ivey failed to deliver on his pre-fight promise: a record-setting 11,200 fans watched McGee defeat Ivey by second-round knockout.

XFC 6: Clash of the Continents
On December 5, 2008, XFC closed out the year with its sixth promotion, XFC 6: Clash of the Continents, returning once again to the St. Pete Times Forum.  The show featured a heavyweight showdown in the main event, with the top-ranked heavyweight in Africa, South African heavyweight champion Rico Hattingh, against undefeated American heavyweight Chad Corvin.  Also on the card was the MMA debut of four-time world female boxing champion of Chevelle Hallback, in the XFC's first-ever female cage fight.

Hallback won by TKO in the first round, and Corvin beat Hattingh, knocking out the South African heavyweight champion.

Among the celebrities in attendance were Linda Hogan, her young boyfriend, and her son Nick Hogan.  When the three were introduced to the crowd, the audience booed loudly.  Video of the Hogans getting booed at the XFC event aired on E!, TMZ, and celebrity websites like Perez Hilton.

XFC 7: School of Hard Knox
XFC made history on February 20, 2009 when it produced the first-ever professional MMA show in Tennessee state history; the Tennessee state legislature had legalized MMA only months earlier.  At XFC 7: School of Hard Knox, former University of Tennessee football player Ovince St. Preux knocked out CT Turner with a kick to the head and Chad Corvin stayed undefeated by stopping the then-6-0 Scott Barrett in the first round.

XFC 8: Regional Conflict
The XFC's first televised fight card featured XFC 8 in Knoxville, Tennessee on April 25, 2009. Jarrod Card defeated Bruce Connors by unanimous decision in the main event of the evening to claim the XFC featherweight title. Light heavyweight prospect Ovince St. Preux, who has gone on to compete in Strikeforce, submitted his opponent, Ombey Mobley, via calf slicer.

XFC 9: Evolution
XFC 9 was held in Tampa Bay on September 5, 2009. The card was headlined by a fight between Jon Koppenhaver and Florida native Mikey Gomez. Koppenhaver won the bout via technical knockout early in the third round.

XFC 10: Night of Champions
Remaining in Tampa Bay, XFC hosted their tenth event on March 19, 2010. Jarrod Card submitted Jason Wood with a rear naked choke to retain the XFC featherweight title in the feature bout. Júnior Assunção caught John Mahlow in a guillotine choke in the first round of their bout to capture the XFC lightweight title.

XFC 11: The Next Generation
Tampa Bay saw the eleventh XFC event on July 9, 2010. In the feature bout, Micah Miller knocked out former top ranked Florida featherweight Bruce Connors inside of one round. Miller connected with a knee from the Thai plum and threw a flurry of punches, ending with a left jab.

XFC 12: Mayhem
XFC 12 took place on October 10, 2010 a non sanctioned bout in Kyrenia, Cyprus. In the feature bout, XFC Featherweight Champion Jarrod Card submitted Tony Hervey with a rear naked choke in a 150 lb. catchweight bout.  Meanwhile, highly ranked welterweight prospect Joe Ray stopped Gerardo Julio Gallegos in the first round due to a cut over the eye in their bout.

XFC 13: Unstoppable
XFC returned to Tampa Bay for their thirteenth event, which occurred on December 3, 2010. A featherweight title bout between Jarrod Card and Luis Palomino headlined the card. The bout went all five rounds, with Palomino winning a unanimous decision. Chris Barnett defeated Mario Rinaldi by TKO in the second round of their bout, while prospect Joe Ray dropped a split decision to Jeremy Smith.

XFC 14: Resurrection
Oct. 21, 2011
Jamie Varner def Nate Jolly via TKO (strikes) at 1:09 of round one
Carmelo Marrero def Scott Barrett via unanimous decision
Marianna Kheyfets def Molly Helsel via unanimous decision
Reggie Pena def Josh Clark via unanimous decision
Nicolae Cury def Elijah Harshbargar via submission (armbar) at 1:27 of round one
Mikey Gomez def Mike Bernhard via submission (rear-naked choke) at 3:50 of round two
John Mahlow def Bruce Connors via unanimous decision. (30-27, 30–27, 30-27) Rd 3 (5:00)

XFC 15: Tribute
Took place on Dec. 2, 2011 in Tampa, Florida at the St. Pete Times Forum

MAIN CARD (HDNet)
Lightweight bout: Eric Reynolds def. Jonatas Novaes by unanimous decision (29-28, 29–28, 29-28) Rd 3 (5:00)
Women's (115 lbs.) bout: Carla Esparza def. Felice Herrig by unanimous decision (30-27, 30–27, 30-27) Rd 3 (5:00)
Lightweight bout: Nick Newell def. Denis Hernandez by submission (heel hook) Rd 1 (1:11)
Welterweight bout: Corey Hill def. Charlie Rader by submission (D’arce Choke) Rd 1 (3:58)
Heavyweight bout: Brandon Sayles def. Imani Lee by submission (verbal) Rd 1 (3:09)
Welterweight bout: Ryan Thomas def. John Kolosci by submission (modified triangle choke) Rd 1 (4:46)
Bantamweight bout: Marlon Moraes def. Chris Manuel by unanimous decision (30-27, 30–27, 30-27) Rd 3 (5:00)

XFC 16: High Stakes
Took place on Feb. 10, 2012 in Knoxville, TN

MAIN CARD (HDNet)
Lightweight bout: Jamie Varner defeated Drew Fickett via submission (punches) at 0:40 of round 1.
Middleweight bout: Josh Samman defeated Mikey Gomez via submission (punches) at 3:37 of round 1. 
Women's 125 lbs bout: Marianna Kheyfets defeated Heather Jo Clark via TKO (doctor stoppage) at 5:00 of round 1.
Catchweight (130 lbs) bout: Chris Wright defeated Len Cook via unanimous decision (30-27, 30–27, 30-27). 
Super Heavyweight bout: Chase Gormley defeated Brandon Sayles via unanimous decision (29-28, 29–28, 29-28).
Middleweight bout: Amaechi Oselukwue defeated Julio Gallegos via KO (punch) at 1:23 of round 1.
Middleweight bout: Dustin West defeated Stoney Hale via TKO (punches) at 1:23 of round 1.

XFC 17: Apocalypse
Took place on April 13, 2012 in Jackson, Tennessee

MAIN CARD (HDNet)
Lightweight bout: Eric Reynolds def. Luciano Dos Santos via unanimous decision
Featherweight bout: Marlon Moraes def. Jarrod Card via KO at 0:48 of round 1
Catchweight bout: (152 lbs.): Nick Newell def. Chris Coggins via unanimous decision 
Women's 115 lbs.: Felice Herrig def. Patricia Vidonic via unanimous decision
Welterweight bout: Charles Blanchard def. Johnny Davis via unanimous decision
Lightweight bout: 
Ion Wood def. Ronnie Rogers via submission (guillotine) at 2:15 of round 2
Middleweight bout: Joel Cooper def. Amaechi Oselukwue via unanimous decision

PRELIMINARY CARD:
Light Heavyweight bout: Teddy Holder def. Bobby Carter by submission (armbar) at 3:27 of round 1
Catchweight bout, (187 lbs.): Bradley Stafford def. Tommy Roberts by unanimous decision
Featherweight bout: Steven Durr def. Michael Manley by unanimous decision

XFC 18: Music City Mayhem
Took place in Nashville, TN on Friday June 22, 2012

MAIN CARD (AXStv):
Middleweight bout: Reggie Pena def. John Salter by submission (guillotine) Rd 2 (0:36)
Heavyweight bout; Scott Barrett def. Gabriel Salinas-Jones by split decision (30-27, 28–29, 30-27)
Flyweight bout: Heather Jo Clark def. Avery Vilche by submission (rear naked choke) Rd 1 (1:03)
Featherweight bout: Luke Sanders def. Zachary Sanders by TKO (strikes) Rd 1 (4:53)
Lightweight bout: Donny Wallace def. Jason Blackford by submission (armbar) Rd 1 (4:38)
Lightweight bout: Scott Holtzman def. Matt Metts by TKO (strikes) Rd 1 (4:13)
Welterweight bout: Joe Ray def. Dustin West by submission (arm triangle) Rd 2 (1:04)

PRELIMINARY CARD:
Lightweight bout: Nate Landwehr def. Billy Mullins by KO (punch) Rd 2 (1:21)
Middleweight bout: Michael Graham def. Cory Robison by unanimous decision (30-27, 30–27, 30-27)
Welterweight bout: Devan Plaisance def. Jonathan Ivey by unanimous decision (29-27, 30–27, 30-27)
Flyweight bout: Justin Pennington def. Dave Hurst by KO (strikes) Rd 1 (4:32)

XFC 19: Charlotte Showdown
Took place on Aug 03, 2012 in Charlotte, North Carolina, at the Grady Cole Center

MAIN CARD (AXS TV) 
Welterweight bout: Nicolae Cury def. Roger Carroll via unanimous decision (29-28, 29–28, 29-28)
Strawweight bout: Felice Herrig def. Simona Soukupova via unanimous decision (30-27, 30–27, 29-28)
Lightweight bout: Nick Newell def. David Mays via knockout (knees) - Round 1, 2:01 
Lightweight bout: Jason Hicks def. Shane Crenshaw via submission (armbar) - Round 2, 3:41
Lightweight bout: Kevin Forant def. Joe Elmore via unanimous decision (30-27, 30–27, 30-27)
Featherweight bout: Keith Richardson def. Lawson McClure via submission (rear-naked choke) - Round 1, 3:40
Middleweight bout: Johnny Buck def. Ricky Rainey via knockout (punches) - Round 2, 1:32
 
PRELIMINARY CARD (Untelevised) 
Lightweight bout: Joey Carroll def. Jeff Tharington via TKO (strikes) - Round 1
Heavyweight bout: Zach Klouse def. Tony Scarlett via TKO (knees) - Round 1, 3:10
Lightweight bout: Carlos Vivas def. Brian Karmolinski via TKO (strikes) - Round 1

XFC 20: High Octane
Took place on Sept 28, 2012 in Knoxville, Tennessee at the Knoxville Civic Auditorium.

MAIN CARD
Lightweight bout: Eric Reynolds def. Lorenzo Borgomeo by Submission (Guillotine Choke) at 3:58, R2
lightweight bout: Scott Holtzman def. Chris Coggins by TKO (Strikes) at 4:46, R1
Women's Flyweight bout: Sofia Bagherdai def. Sarah Maloy by TKO (Strikes) at 4:01, R1
Bantamweight bout: Joby Sanchez def. Chris Dunn by Submission (Triangle Choke) at 1:49, R1
Bantamweight bout: Shah Bobonis def. Cornelius Godfrey by Unanimous Decision
Welterweight bout: Drew Kennedy def. Anthony Lemon by Submission (Rear Naked Choke) at 4:20, R1
Featherweight bout: Nate Landwehr def. Chris Wright by TKO (Strikes) at 3:56, R2

Preliminary Bouts:
Welterweight bout: Craig Johnson def. Zachary Odom by TKO (Strikes), R2
Lightweight bout: Ian Boxhorn def. Chad Perrine by Unanimous Decision
Featherweight bout: Adam Hyde def. David Miles by Submission (Rear Naked Choke), R3
Welterweight bout: Jake Fine def. Steven Thomas by submission (Rear Naked Choke), R1
Bantamweight bout: Tyler Hunley def. Chonci Houston by Unanimous Decision

XFC 21: Night of Champions II
Took place on Dec. 7, 2012 in Nashville, Tennessee at the Nashville Municipal Auditorium.

MAIN CARD (AXS TV)
Lightweight Championship bout: Nick Newell def. Eric Reynolds via submission (rear-naked choke) - Round 1, 1:22 (for vacant lightweight title)
Welterweight bout: Ryan Thomas def. Corey Hill via submission (armbar) - Round 1, 2:34
Women's Flyweight bout: Stephanie Eggink def. Heather Clark via unanimous decision (29-28, 30–27, 30-27)
Welterweight bout: Ricky Rainey def. Donny Wallace via TKO (punches) - Round 1, 1:42
Featherweight bout: Jarrod Card def. Keith Richardson via submission (guillotine choke) - Round 2, 0:24

PRELIMINARY CARD
Middleweight bout: Marcus Finch def. Dustin West via knockout strikes) - Round 1, 0:46
Lightweight bout: Jorge Medina def. D.J. Miller via submission (rear-naked choke) - Round 3, 2:36
Featherweight bout: Cromwell Stewart def. Zachary Hicks via split decision
Welterweight bout: Gerric Hayes def. Jason Blackford via TKO - Round 2, 2:56
Middleweight bout: Tommy Roberts def. Josh Phelps via TKO - Round 1, 3:07

XFC 22: Crossing The Line
Took place on Feb. 22, 2013 in Charlotte, North Carolina at the Grady Cole Center.

MAIN CARD (AXS TV)
Lightweight bout: Scott Holtzman def. Jason Hicks via unanimous decision (30-27, 30–27, 30-27) (title eliminator)
Welterweight bout: Ricky Rainey def. Joseph Corneroli via unanimous decision (30-27, 30–27, 30-27)
Women's Strawweight bout: Pearl Gonzalez def. Suzie Montero via submission (armbar) Round 1, 4:56
Welterweight bout: Roger Carroll def. Josh Eagans via submission (triangle choke) Round 2, 0:59
Flyweight bout: D'Angelo Bynum def. Jimmy Fowler via unanimous decision (30-27, 30–27, 29-28)
Featherweight bout: D'juan Owens def. Nate Landwehr via unanimous decision (29-28, 29–28, 30-27)

PRELIMINARY CARD 
Bantamweight bout: Joseph Carroll def. Len Cook via unanimous decision
Lightweight bout: Jeremy Severn def. Aaron Osborne via submission (armbar) Round 1, 4:50
Bantamweight bout: Rahshun Ball def. Thomas Campbell via unanimous decision
Lightweight bout: Cody Wells def. Luke Neyland via TKO (strikes) Round 1, 2:45
Featherweight bout: Carlos Vivas def. Brandon Boggs via TKO Round 1, 3:56

XFC 23: Louisville Slugfest
Took place on April 19, 2013 in Louisville, Kentucky at the Kentucky International Convention Centre.

MAIN CARD (AXS TV)
Welterweight bout: Luis Santos def. Shamar Bailey via TKO (strikes), Round 1, 1:02
Women's Strawweight bout: Stephanie Eggink def. Brianna Van Buren via Decision (unanimous)
Featherweight bout: Zack Underwood def. Deivison Ribeiro via Decision (unanimous)
Flyweight bout: Joey Diehl def. Eric Moell via Submission (guillotine choke), Round 2, 0:31
Middleweight bout: Julio Gallegos def. John Troyer via TKO (strikes), Round 2, 1:41
Featherweight bout: B.J. Ferguson def. Charles Stanford via TKO (strikes], Round 1, 0:59

PRELIMINARY CARD
Lightweight bout: Eugene Perrin def. Augusta Tindall via Decision (unanimous)
Middleweight bout: Scott Hope def. Joshua Blanchard via TKO (strikes), Round 1, 1:25
Featherweight bout: Brandon Sandefur def. Josh Cooper via Submission (rear naked choke), Round 2, 1:35

AMATEUR CARD
Welterweight bout: Brandon Hurst def. Eric Jarvis via Decision (unanimous)

XFC 24: Collision Course
Took place on June 14, 2013 in Tampa, Florida, USA

Lightweight Championship bout: Scott Holtzman def. John Mahlow via TKO (strikes) at 2:53, Round two to win vacant XFC lightweight title
Welterweight bout: Ricky Rainey def. Reggie Pena via TKO (strikes) at 4:33 of round one
Welterweight bout: Luis Santos def. Dave Courchaine via TKO (strikes) at :10 of round one
Lightweight bout: Eric Reynolds def. Kevin Forant by submission (arm-triangle choke) at 4:13 of round one
Women's Flyweight bout: Cortney Casey def. Kelly Warren by submission (rear-naked choke) at 3:33 of round one
Featherweight bout: Deivison Ribeiro def. Shah Bobonis via unanimous decision (30-27, 30–27, 30-27)
Featherweight bout: John Cofer def. Chad Livingston via unanimous decision (29-28, 29–28, 29-28)
Featherweight bout: Nick Smith def. Ladarious Jackson via disqualification (illegal knee) at 2:38 of round two
Bantamweight bout: Patrick Williams def. Gabe Maldonado via TKO (punches) at :50 of round one
Bantamweight bout: Jason Ignacek def. Kenneth Crowder via submission (triangle choke) at 1:03 of round two 
Bantamweight bout: Gilbert Burgos def. Jason Gladey via unanimous decision (30-27, 30–27, 29-28)

XFC 25: Boiling Point
Took place on September 6, 2013 in Albuquerque, New Mexico, USA

Women's Strawweight Championship bout: Stephanie Eggink def. Angela Magaña via Submission (triangle) at 3:10 of round two
Welterweight bout: Dheigo Lima def. Ricky Rainey via Decision (unanimous)
Welterweight bout: Ryan Thomas def. Rocky France via Submission (triangle choke) at 1:27 of round two
Bantamweight bout: Joby Sanchez def. Eric Moell via TKO (elbows) at 3:15 of round one
Featherweight Semifinal Tournament bout: Farkhad Sharipov def. Stephen Bass via TKO (punches) at 4:19 of round two
Lightweight bout: Lando Vannata def. J. P. Reese via Decision (split)

XFC 26: Night of Champions III
Took place on October 18, 2013 in Nashville, Tennessee, USA

XFC 27: Frozen Fury
Took place on December 13, 2013 in Muskegon, Michigan, USA

XFC International - Season 1

XFC International 1: Meller vs. French
Took place on Feb. 8, 2014 in São Paulo, Brazil

XFC International 2: Alvaro vs. Nascimento
Took place on Mar. 15, 2014 in São Paulo, Brazil

XFC International 3: Santos vs. Morales
Took place on Mar. 29, 2014 in São Paulo, Brazil

XFC International 4: Dos Santos vs. Lowe
Took place on Apr. 26, 2014 in São Paulo, Brazil

XFC International 5: Solano vs. Assuncao
Took place on June 7, 2014 in São Paulo, Brazil

Season 1 Tournament Winners

XFC International - Season 2

XFC International 6: Ribeiro vs. Lowe
Took place on September 27, 2014 in Araraquara, Brazil

XFC International 7: Nascimento vs. Abiltarov
Took place on November 1, 2014 in São Paulo, Brazil

XFC International 8: Nam vs. Vieira
Took place on December 13, 2014 in Clube Concordia - Campinas, Brazil

XFC International 9: Nascimento vs. Azevedo
Took place on March 14, 2015 in São Paulo, Brazil

XFC International 10: Night of Champions
Took place on July 4, 2015 in São Paulo, Brazil

Season 2 Tournament Winners

XFC International - Season 3

XFC International 11: Botelho vs. Gomez
Took place on September 19, 2015 in São Paulo, Brazil

XFC International 12: Harris vs. Pereira
Took place on November 28, 2015 in São Paulo, Brazil

XFC International 13: Assuncao vs. Dos Santos Jr.
Took place on December 5, 2015 in São Paulo, Brazil

|}

XFC International 14: Virginio vs. Vieira
Was supposed to take place on May 28, 2016 in São Paulo, Brazil, but was cancelled, and Season 3 championships were not awarded.

XFC 43
Took place on Nov. 11, 2020 in Atlanta, Georgia, USA

XFC 44
Took place on May 28, 2021 in Des Moines, Iowa, USA

XFC 45
Took place on August 6, 2021 in Grand Rapids, Michigan, USA

XFC 46

Current champions

Title history

Lightweight Championship
146 to 155 lbs (66 to 70 kg)

Featherweight Championship
136 to 145 lbs (61 to 66 kg)

Bantamweight Championship
126 to 135 lbs (57 to 61 kg)

Flyweight Championship
116 to 125 lb (53 to 57 kg)

Women's Flyweight Championship
116 to 125 lbs

Women's Strawweight Championship
106 to 115 lbs

Media coverage

References

External links
Official Website of Xtreme Fighting Championships (XFC)
XFC event results on Sherdog

Sports organizations established in 2006
Sports organizations of the United States
Mixed martial arts organizations
2006 establishments in the United States